Adrian E. Regnier (August 28, 1889 – March 2, 1956) was an American football player and coach. He played college football at Brown University at the halfback and end positions from 1907 to 1909.  He was the captain of the 1909 Brown Bears football team and was selected as a consensus All-American at the end position in 1909.  Regnier also played baseball and basketball and was a member of the Phi Delta Theta fraternity.  He graduated from Brown in 1910.

In April 1910, he was hired as the football coach at Union College. He served one year as the head coach of the Union Dutchmen football team, compiling a record of 2–4–1.

During World War I, he served in the United States Army. He was injured in approximately May 1918 while serving in a machine gun battalion of the New England Division.  He later became a sales engineer.  He died in March 1956 at Springfield Hospital in Wilbraham, Massachusetts.

References

1889 births
1956 deaths
American football ends
American football halfbacks
Brown Bears football players
Union Dutchmen football coaches
All-American college football players
United States Army personnel of World War I